Intestinal villi (singular: villus) are small, finger-like projections that extend into the lumen of the small intestine. Each villus is approximately 0.5–1.6 mm in length (in humans), and has many microvilli projecting from the enterocytes of its epithelium which collectively form the striated or brush border. Each of these microvilli are about 1 µm in length, around 1000 times shorter than a single villus. The intestinal villi are much smaller than any of the circular folds in the intestine. 

Villi increase the internal surface area of the intestinal walls making available a greater surface area for absorption. An increased absorptive area is useful because digested nutrients (including monosaccharide and amino acids) pass into the semipermeable villi through diffusion, which is effective only at short distances.  In other words, increased surface area (in contact with the fluid in the lumen) decreases the average distance travelled by nutrient molecules, so effectiveness of diffusion increases. The villi are connected to the blood vessels so the circulating blood then carries these nutrients away.

Structure

Microanatomy

Enterocytes, along with goblet cells,  represent the principal cell types of the epithelium of the villi in the small intestine.

Function
There, the villi and the microvilli increase intestinal absorptive surface area approximately 40-fold and 600-fold, respectively, providing exceptionally efficient absorption of nutrients in the lumen. 

There are also enzymes (enterocyte digestive enzyme) on the surface for digestion. Villus capillaries collect amino acids and simple sugars taken up by the villi into the blood stream. Villus lacteals (lymph capillary) collect absorbed chylomicrons, which are lipoproteins composed of triglycerides, cholesterol and amphipathic proteins, and are taken to the rest of the body through the lymph fluid.

Villi are specialized for absorption in the small intestine as they have a thin wall, one cell thick, which enables a shorter diffusion path. They have a large surface area so there will be more efficient absorption of fatty acids and glycerol into the blood stream. They have a rich blood supply to keep a concentration gradient.

Clinical significance

Villous atrophy

In diseases of the small intestine the villi can become flattened due to the effects of inflammation, and the villi can sometimes disappear. This deterioration is known as villous atrophy, and is often a feature of coeliac disease.

Additional images

References

Further reading
 C. W. Chan, Y. K. Leung and K. W. Chan (2014). "Microscopic anatomy of the vasculature of the human intestinal villus - a study with review". European Journal of Anatomy, 18 (4): 291–301.

Small intestine